Lands Tribunal may refer to:

United Kingdom 
 Lands Tribunal (England, Wales and Northern Ireland)
 Lands Tribunal for Scotland
 Lands Tribunal for Northern Ireland

Hong Kong 
 Lands Tribunal (Hong Kong)